Narika is a Fremont, California organization that confronts domestic violence in South Asian American communities.

Narika was founded in 1991 as the Bay Area Indian Women's Support Group and later as the South Asian Women's Support Group. Founders launched a crisis helpline, and established the organization in 1992.

The group works with a variety of community partners and offers services to women and children in abusive situations in English, Bengali, Gujarati, Hindi, Kannada, Konkani, Malayalam, Marathi, Nepali, Punjabi, Sinhala, Tamil, Telugu, Tibetan, and Urdu.

References 

1992 establishments in California
Asian-American culture in California
Bangladeshi-American culture
Bengali-American culture
Domestic violence-related organizations in the United States
Gujarati diaspora
Indian-American culture in California
Nepalese American
Non-profit organizations based in the San Francisco Bay Area
Organizations based in Berkeley, California
Organizations established in 1992
Pakistani-American culture in California
Punjabi-American culture
South Asian American organizations
Sri Lankan-American culture
Tamil-American culture
Tibetan-American culture
Women in California
Women's rights organizations
Migration-related organizations based in the United States